LakeView Technology Academy is a vocational high school in the Kenosha Unified School District (KUSD) in Pleasant Prairie, Wisconsin. It serves students grades 9 to 12 from all across KUSD with a focus on STEM education. LakeView opened in the fall of 1997 as a response to overcrowding in KUSD. The school also has partnerships with the Kenosha Area Business Alliance and Gateway Technical College. LakeView is ranked the 335th best high school in the nation, making it the 4th best in Wisconsin.

History 
In June 2022, it was announced by the school board of the Kenosha Unified School District that they have approved the relocation of LakeView to the former location of the Chrysler plant in Kenosha. The new location will provide improved accessibility from the previous location. There will also be new facilities constructed on the property for the use of Gateway Technical College students in Kenosha.

Academics 
Students at LakeView have the opportunity to earn college credits in High School due to the school's partnership with Gateway. Many of these dual credit (college credit) classes are offered at the school, as well as AP level courses. PE and core classes are still provided by the school with all core courses being honors level. LakeView has an agreement with Harborside to help provide music programs for the school.

Extracurricular activities 
LakeView offers many activities & clubs for students to participate in.

 African American Youth Initiative
 Book Club
 Bowling
 Board Game Club
 Chess Club
 Debate Club
 Environmental Club
 HOSA
 National Honor Society
 Prom Committee
 Radio Club
 Rocket Club
 ROV (Remote Operated Vehicle)
 SkillsUSA
 Student Government
 STEAM (Tech/Art Club)
 Supermileage Vehicle Club
 Young Women's Forum

References

Educational institutions established in 1997
High schools in Kenosha, Wisconsin
Public high schools in Wisconsin
1997 establishments in Wisconsin